The Twin Spires Turf Sprint Stakes is a Grade II American thoroughbred horse race for horses age three and older over a distance of  furlongs on the turf held annually in early May on the Kentucky Oaks day meeting at Churchill Downs in Louisville, Kentucky  during the spring meeting.

History

The event was inaugurated on 5 May 1995 as the Churchill Downs Turf Sprint Stakes as the sixth race on the undercard of the Kentucky Oaks day meeting over a distance of five furlongs. The event was won by the second favorite Long Suit, who led all the way to record a  length victory in a time of 56.90 seconds.

In 1999 Aegon committed to a long term sponsorship which reflected in the name of the event. This sponsorship ended in 2009. In 2011 Churchill Downs administration renamed the event to the current name, Twin Spires Turf Sprint Stakes.

The event was first classified as Grade III in 2001 and a Grade II race in 2020.

In 2015, Power Alert set the course record of 0.55.17.

In 2019 the distance of the event was increased to  furlongs.

Records

Speed record
  furlongs: 1:03.97 - World of Trouble (2019)
 5 furlongs: 55.17 - Power Alert (2015)

 Margins
  lengths - World of Trouble (2019)

Most wins by a jockey
 3 - Julien Leparoux (2006, 2010, 2015)

Most wins by a trainer
 3 - W. Bret Calhoun    (2008, 2009, 2014)

Most wins by an owner
 2 - Mike Cloonan (2001, 2005)  
 2 - Carl R. Moore Management (2008, 2009) 
 2 - Martin Racing Stable (2008, 2014)

Winners

See also
 List of American and Canadian Graded races

References

Graded stakes races in the United States
Grade 2 stakes races in the United States
Turf races in the United States
Open sprint category horse races
Churchill Downs horse races
Recurring sporting events established in 1995
1995 establishments in Kentucky